Royston William Baldwin  (28 July 1927 – 24 August 2016) was an Australian rules footballer who played with Hawthorn in the Victorian Football League (VFL).

Baldwin enlisted in August 1945, two weeks after his 18th birthday, and served until October 1947, spending 18 months overseas in New Britain.

In 1982 he was awarded the Medal of the Order of Australia for "services to sport in the fields of cricket and Australian rules football."

Notes

External links 

1927 births
Australian rules footballers from Victoria (Australia)
Hawthorn Football Club players
Australian Army personnel of World War II
Recipients of the Medal of the Order of Australia
2016 deaths
Australian Army soldiers